The 2016 IIHF Challenge Cup of Asia Division I was the third IIHF Challenge Cup of Asia Division I competition, an annual international ice hockey tournament held by the International Ice Hockey Federation (IIHF). It took place between 9 and 14 April 2016 in Bishkek, Kyrgyzstan.

Participants

Preliminary round

Awards and statistics

Awards
Media All-Stars:
 MVP:  Oleg Kolodii
 Goalkeeper:  Te Lin Chu
 Defenceman:  Ali Amir
 Forward:  Ban Kin Loke

Scoring Leaders

GP = Games played; G = Goals; A = Assists; Pts = Points; +/− = Plus/minus; PIM = Penalties in minutes 

 Source: IIHF.com

Goaltending leaders
Only the top five goaltenders, based on save percentage, who have played at least 40% of their team's minutes, are included in this list.

TOI = Time on ice (minutes:seconds); SA = Shots against; GA = Goals against; GAA = Goals against average; Sv% = Save percentage; SO = Shutouts

Source: IIHF.com

References

External links
International Ice Hockey Federation
Challenge Cup of Asia - IIHF

IIHF Challenge Cup of Asia
IIHF Challenge Cups of Asia